The 2001 Sparkassen Cup doubles was the tennis doubles event of the twelfth edition of the Sparkassen Cup; a WTA Tier II tournament held in Leipzig, Germany. 

Arantxa Sánchez Vicario and Anne-Gaëlle Sidot were the defending champions but chose not to compete this year.

Elena Likhovtseva and Nathalie Tauziat won the title, defeating Květa Hrdličková and Barbara Rittner in the final, 6–4, 6–2.

Seeds

Draw

Draw

External links
 2001 Sparkassen Cup Draw

Sparkassen Cup (tennis)
2001 WTA Tour